Taiwo (variant forms: Taiye, Taye, Taiyewo) is a name of Yoruba origin meaning "the first twin to taste the world" or the one who comes before Kehinde. Although Taiwo is the firstborn twin, in Yoruba belief Taiwo is considered the younger twin, having been sent into the world by Kehinde to determine if it is the right time to be born. The names are associated with the Yoruba belief in Ibeji, sacred twins.

Given name
Augustus Taiwo Solarin, (1922–1994) Nigerian educator and activist
Taiwo Ajai Lycett (born 1941), Nigerian actress
Hassanat Taiwo Akinwande, stage name Wunmi, Nigerian film and television actress
Taiwo Aladefa (born 1974), retired Nigerian 100 m hurdler
Taiwo Allimi (born 1944), Nigerian journalist and media executive
Taiwo Atieno (born 1985), English-born Kenyan international footballer
Taiwo Awoniyi (born 1997), Nigerian footballer
Pastor Taiwo Odubiyi (born 1965), Senior Associate Pastor, Still Waters Church International, Ikorodu, Nigeria
Taiwo Owatemi, British Labour MP
Taiwo Rafiu (born 1972), Nigerian women's basketball player
Taiye Selasi (born 1979), British writer
Taye Babalola (born, 1991), Nigerian footballer
Taiwo Damola Dawud (born,1993) Nigerian fashion designer
Taiwo Ehineni, Professor in African Languages, Harvard University, USA.

Last/family name
Cornelius Olaleye Taiwo (born 1910, died 2014), Nigerian educator and lawyer
Ibrahim Taiwo, Military Governor of Kwara State from July 1975 to February 1976
Jeremy Taiwo (born 1990), American decathlete
Joseph Taiwo (born 1959), retired Nigerian athlete who competed in the triple jump
Olúfẹ́mi O. Táíwò, Nigerian-American philosopher
Solomon Taiwo (born 1985), footballer
Taye Taiwo (born 1985), Nigerian professional footballer
Tom Taiwo "Tom" Taiwo (born 1990), English football midfielder
Wasiu Taiwo (born 1976), Nigerian football player

See also
Kehinde
Ibeji
Tai Wo
Taiho (disambiguation)
Tawo
Tayo (disambiguation)
Tiyo

References

Yoruba given names
Yoruba-language surnames